Wu Wen-Chien (born June 9, 1977) is a Taiwanese Olympic long-distance runner that represented Chinese Taipei in the 2004 and 2008 Summer Olympics in the marathon.

Competition record

References

1977 births
Living people
Taiwanese male long-distance runners
Taiwanese steeplechase runners
Olympic athletes of Taiwan
Taiwanese male marathon runners
Athletes (track and field) at the 2004 Summer Olympics
Athletes (track and field) at the 2008 Summer Olympics
Athletes (track and field) at the 2002 Asian Games
Athletes (track and field) at the 2006 Asian Games
Athletes (track and field) at the 2010 Asian Games
Male steeplechase runners
Asian Games competitors for Chinese Taipei
Taipei Marathon male winners